Jim McLaughlin (born November 18, 1960) is an American volleyball coach. He was most recently the head coach of the women's volleyball team at Notre Dame. McLaughlin was selected to be inducted into AVCA Hall of Fame in 2021.

Teams under McLaughlin's coaching have accomplished two national championships, six Final Four appearances (most recently in 2013), six trips to the Elite Eight, two national players of the year, three Pac-12 (formerly the Pac-10) Conference titles, and 13 players that combined for 28 AVCA All-America awards. McLaughlin was named the 2004 NCAA National Coach of the Year and received the 2002, 2004, 2005, and 2013 Pac-12 Coach of the Year awards.

Before Washington, he spent seven seasons as the men's head coach at USC, where he won the 1990 national championship and finished as runner-up in 1991, followed by a four-year run in the Big 12 Conference leading the women's program at Kansas State.

Through the 2013 season, McLaughlin had a 326-87 record with the Huskies in 13 seasons.

Collegiate career
McLaughlin attended Santa Monica Junior College (1980–81), where he played volleyball for two years and transferred to UC Santa Barbara (1982–83). He was the Gauchos' starting setter for two seasons, earning honorable mention All-America honors as a senior.

Head coach

USC

McLaughlin was the head coach for the USC Trojans men's volleyball team for seven seasons. In his first year as head coach in 1990, he led the Trojans to the NCAA Men's Volleyball Championship match, defeating Long Beach State, and finished as runner-up the following year. While at USC, McLaughlin's teams were ranked in the top 10 five times, while 15 players earned All-America accolades, led by two-time national player of the year Bryan Ivie.

Kansas State

McLaughlin spent four seasons building the Kansas State women's program into a national power; he compiled an 82-43 record and took the Wildcats to four consecutive NCAA tournaments. In his final season, McLaughlin led Kansas State to a 22-9 record, a program-best No. 16 national ranking and its first-ever trip to the NCAA Sweet 16, before losing to top-seeded Wisconsin.

During his tenure in Manhattan, two Wildcats earned All-America honors, seven were named to the All-Big 12 first team and 15 garnered first-team academic all-conference accolades. McLaughlin also was honored as the 1999 Big 12 Conference Coach of the Year.

Washington

When McLaughlin took over the Washington program in 2001, the team was last in the Pac-10 Conference. In his first year at UW, he led the Huskies to an 11-16 record and a 4-14 mark in the Pac-10. The team's 11 wins in 2001 were the most for the program since 1997.  Just one year later, the Huskies went 20-11 and made the NCAA second round. Since 2003, Washington has not won fewer than 23 matches or lost more than nine in any season.

In 2004, the Huskies won their first-ever Pac-10 title, and McLaughlin earned his first AVCA National Coach of the Year honor. In his fifth year at UW in 2005, he led Washington to its first-ever NCAA Women's Volleyball Championship and a 32-1 record as Washington swept all six of their matches in the tournament, including top-ranked Nebraska in the final at the Alamodome in San Antonio. McLaughlin was named the Pac-10 Coach of the Year, and made history as the first coach in NCAA history to win a national championship in both men and women's volleyball, having led the USC men's team to a national title in 1990.

In 2006, he led UW to its third straight national semifinal, but the Dawgs fell to runner-up Stanford.

The NCAA Championships were hosted in Seattle at KeyArena at Seattle Center in 2013. The Huskies, led by AVCA National Player of the Year and Honda Award Winner Krista Vansant, won the Pac-12 title and reached the Final Four, but fell in straight sets in the semifinals to eventual national champion Penn State.

In his 13 years as head coach, McLaughlin established Washington volleyball as a championship-caliber team. Under his leadership, Washington made an appearance in the NCAA Tournament every year except in his first year in 2001 and boasts a .789 winning percentage. There have been 51 players that have been honored with All-Conference selections, 50 Academic All-Conference honorees, 31 All-Americans and 8 Academic All-Americans since McLaughlin’s arrival.

Notre Dame

McLaughlin was named the women's volleyball head coach at the University of Notre Dame on January 17, 2015.  He resigned his position in June 2018 due to severe back issues.

Quick facts
  winning percentage at UW (through 2013)
 31 All-Americans
 51 All-Conference selections
 50 Academics All-Conference honorees
 24 Professional Players produced
 12 Straight NCAA Tournament appearances
   8 Academic All-Americans
   4 Final Four Appearances
   2 National Championships

Head coaching record

Men's college volleyball

Women's college volleyball

Final Pac-10 season was 2010; became Pac-12 in 2011

Awards and honors
2021 – AVCA Hall of Fame
2013 – Pac-12 Coach of the Year
2005 – Pac-10 Coach of the Year
2004 – AVCA National Coach of the Year, AVCA Pacific Region Coach of the Year, Pac-10 Coach of the Year
2002 – Pac-10 Coach of the Year
1999 – Big 12 Coach of the Year

Personal
Jim is married to the former Margaret Jarc, a four-year soccer monogram winner at the University of Notre Dame. They have three daughters, Megan, Molly, and Marit.

References

1960 births
Living people
American men's volleyball players
American volleyball coaches
Kansas State Wildcats women's volleyball coaches
Notre Dame Fighting Irish women's volleyball coaches
Pepperdine Waves men's volleyball coaches
USC Trojans men's volleyball coaches
Washington Huskies women's volleyball coaches
UC Santa Barbara Gauchos men's volleyball players
People from Malibu, California